Skyview High School is a high school in the Salmon Creek area of northern Vancouver, Washington. Opened in 1997, it is the newest of six high schools in the Vancouver School District. The building design incorporates an open classroom floor plan with the use of many windows and features a  common area at the center of the school. Skyview is home to the SMT (Science Math and Technology Magnet) for the Vancouver schools.

Athletics

Football 
Skyview's football team has competed in the 4A state playoffs every year since 2005 including three semifinal appearances (2009, 2011, and 2016) and one state championship game appearance (2011).

Cheerleading 
Skyview's varsity cheer team won state in 2009 bringing home Skyview's second state championship for the school.

Tennis
Skyview's girls tennis team won the 2013 4A state championship. Skyview's no-cut policy for the tennis team was recognized by the United States Tennis Association.

Basketball
The girls varsity basketball team won the 4A state championship in 2012.

Baseball 
Skyview's baseball team won the 2013 4A state championship. They made 3 consecutive state final four appearances from 2017-2019 and had a 17-0 record in the 2021 season.

Boys Soccer 
Skyview's boys soccer team won the 2012 4A state championship.

Arts

Marching Band
Skyview's Marching Band competes in the Northwest Association of Performing Arts. The band has competed in the open class since 2000. The band was selected to perform at the 2008 Summer Olympics opening ceremony, hosted in China.

Dance Team
The Reign dance team were state champs in 2005, 2009 and 2011.

Student activities

Robotics
Skyview High School is home to the FIRST Robotics Competition team 2811, The Stormbots. They have been competing since 2008.

Demographics
In October 2012, the school's population was 52.9% male and 47.1% female.  In the same report from the Office of the Superintendent of Public Instruction, the racial breakdown was 77.0% white, 9.7% Hispanic, 5.6% Asian or Pacific Islander, 3.7% mixed race, 3.1% black and 0.9% Native American.

September 2021 protest
On September 3, 2021, an anti-mask protest occurred outside the school, resulting in an hour-long lockdown for Skyview and the two schools adjacent to it after an attempt was made to escort a student with a medical exemption into the school. The student's mother, Megan Gabriel, said that her daughter had post-traumatic stress disorder and anxiety and that masks could trigger panic attacks. The far-right groups Patriot Prayer and Proud Boys attended the protest, chanting "USA", according to a video posted on social media. In a statement, Vancouver Public Schools communications director Pat Nuzzo said: "As a safety precaution, Skyview, Alki and Chinook were put into a lockdown on Sept. 3 due to a disturbance by protesters who attempted to come onto Skyview's campus". Some students and staff members held signs in support of masks as a counter-protest, while protesters called female students by vitriolic names.

References

External links

Skyview High School, Official Website
GSHL Football - Skyview High School
 Skyview Tennis, Official Page
 Skyview Marching Band and Reign Dance Team, Official Page
School Digger - Skyview HS page

High schools in Vancouver, Washington
Educational institutions established in 1997
Public high schools in Washington (state)
Magnet schools in Washington (state)
1997 establishments in Washington (state)